Replication protein A 70 kDa DNA-binding subunit is a protein that in humans is encoded by the RPA1 gene.

Interactions 
Replication protein A1 has been shown to interact with:

 BRCA2, 
 BLM,
 MCM2, 
 MCM4, 
 MCM6, 
 MCM7, 
 MUTYH, 
 ORC2L, 
 ORC6L, 
 P53, 
 RPA2, 
 RPA3, 
 TIPIN, 
 TP53BP1,  and
 XPA.

See also
 Replication protein A
 Replication protein A2
 Replication protein A3
 Single-stranded binding protein

References

Further reading